Ulanica  is a village in the administrative district of Gmina Dynów, within Rzeszów County, Subcarpathian Voivodeship, in south-eastern Poland.

References

Ulanica